This article shows all participating team squads at the women's beach volleyball tournament at the 2008 Summer Olympics in Beijing.

Australia

Team Cook-Barnett

Austria

Team Schwaiger-Schwaiger

Belgium

Team Van Breedam-Mouha

Brazil

Team Larissa-Ana Paula

Team Talita-Renata

China

Team Tian-Wang

*The FIVB website profile has age 22, the Beach Volleyball Database profile has age 24

Team Xue-Zhang

Cuba

Team F. Grasset-L. Peraza

Team Esteves Ribalta-M. Crespo

Georgia

Team Saka-Rtvelo

Germany

Team Goller-Ludwig

Team Pohl-Rau

Greece

Team Karantasiou-Arvaniti

Team Koutroumanidou-Tsiartsiani

Japan

Team Teru Saiki-Kusuhara

Mexico

Team Candelas-García

Netherlands

Team Kadijk-Mooren

Norway

Team Håkedal-Tørlen

Team Maaseide-Glesnes

Russia

Team Uryadova-Shiryaeva

South Africa

Team Augoustides-Nel

Switzerland

Team Kuhn-Schwer

United States

Team Walsh-May-Treanor

Team Branagh-Youngs

See also
Beach volleyball at the 2008 Summer Olympics – Men's team rosters

References

Beach volleyball player bios, FIVB
Beach Volleyball Database

2
2008
Volleyball at the 2008 Summer Olympics
2008 in women's volleyball
Vol